Delhi is an unincorporated community in Wilkes County, in the U.S. state of Georgia.

History
A post office called Delhi was established in 1858. The community was named after Delhi, in India. A variant name was "Pistol".

References

Unincorporated communities in Wilkes County, Georgia
Unincorporated communities in Georgia (U.S. state)